Hilde Domin (27 July 1912 – 22 February 2006) is the pseudonym of Hilde Palm (née Löwenstein), a German lyric poet and writer. She was among the most important German-language poets of her time.

Biography
Domin was born in 1909 in Cologne as Hildegard Löwenstein, the daughter of Eugen Löwenstein, a German Jewish lawyer (her year of birth has been erroneously reported in some accounts as 1912).

Between 1929 and 1932 she studied at Heidelberg University, Cologne University, University of Bonn, and the Humboldt University of Berlin. She initially studied law, and later changed her specialism to economics, social sciences and philosophy. Among her teachers were Karl Jaspers and Karl Mannheim.

As a result of the increasingly virulent anti-semitism in Nazi Germany, she emigrated to Italy in 1932 with her friend (and future husband) Erwin Walter Palm who was a writer and student of archaeology. She received a doctorate in political science in Florence in 1935 and worked as a language teacher in Rome from 1935 to 1939. She and Erwin Walter Palm were married in 1936. With Hitler's visit to Rome and the acrimonious atmosphere of fascist Italy under Mussolini the couple was prompted to once again emigrate.

In 1939 the couple went to England where she worked as language teacher at St Aldyn’s College. Hilde's fears of the Nazi menace did not wane, and the couple tried frenetically to obtain a visa to any American nation. None of their preferred countries (the United States, Mexico, Argentina and Brazil) granted them a visa, while some charged them exorbitant sums of money which they didn't have. The only country to unconditionally welcome them was the Dominican Republic, where they emigrated in 1940.

In Santo Domingo, where they lived for 14 years, Hilde worked as a translator and lecturer at the University of Santo Domingo, and as a photographer of architecture. Her photographs meticulously documented the Ciudad Colonial (old city) of Santo Domingo, which illustrated Palm's seminal book on the art and architecture of Europe's oldest American city. Their work was referenced by the Dominican government in their successful bid before UNESCO to grant the entire sector of old Santo Domingo World Heritage Site status in 1989. She often worked together with other European exiles, such as Austrian photographer Kurt Schnitzer. In November 2006, Hilde was awarded the Order of Merit of Duarte, Sánchez and Mella in recognition of her efforts to advance Dominican culture.

Putting aside her studies in Political Sciences and Sociology, Hilde began to write in Santo Domingo towards 1951, after the death of her mother, acquiring the pseudonym Hilde Domin, in gratitude to the city which offered her shelter. Many afternoons were spent by Hilde at the home of Francisco Prats Ramírez, discussing literature and poetry among intellectuals in endless tertulias.

Some years after the end of World War II, in 1954, she and her husband (whose family had been murdered by the Nazis) returned to Germany. Domin lived as a writer in Heidelberg from 1961 until her death.

She was a close friend of Nelly Sachs, her lyric colleague living in Stockholm, who won the Nobel Prize in Literature in 1966. From 1960 to 1967 they had a correspondence that was almost sisterly in intensity. She was also a friend of Hans-Georg Gadamer.

In 1968, she presented Das zweite Paradies (The second Paradise), her first volume of prose, and a critical love story dealing with the experience of exile and home.

Her poems are rarely metaphorical, completely unpathetic and of a simple vocabulary
that in its simplicity meets magic, but the more frequently evoking and appealing; hence poems, which are easily accessible to a wide range of readers, and not confined to specialist audiences. Her output also included some pieces on literature theory.

In an interview in 1986 she was asked the question how much courage a writer needed. "A writer needs three types of courage. To be himself/herself. The courage not to lie and to misrepresent and skew, to call things by their right names. And thirdly, to believe in the open mindedness and forthrightness of the others."

Her husband died in 1988. The anthology of poetry "Der Baum blüht trotzdem" (The Tree blossoms nevertheless) which was published in 1999, is her personal farewell. In one of her late poems she encourages us not to become tired. We are rather, as she writes, called to long for "the miracle/quietly/like a bird/the hand reaching out".

She continued to read her poems to audiences until 2006. She died in Heidelberg, a "grande dame" of German verse, aged 96, on 22 February 2006.

Books
 Hilde Domin - Gesammelte Gedichte (Collected poems), Editorial S. Fischer
 Ziehende Landschaft (Poem, 1955)
 Nur eine Rose als Stütze (Poems, 1959). Her first collection of poetry.
 Rückkehr der Schiffe (Poems, 1962)
 Linguistik (Poems, 1963)
 Hier (Poems, 1964)
 Höhlenbilder (Poems, 1968)
 Das zweite Paradies (Prose, 1968)
 Wozu Lyrik heute. Dichtung und Leser in der gesteuerten Gesellschaft (Prose, 1968). In this essay Hilde Domin asks the question: Why lyrics?
 Ich will dich (Poems, 1970)
 Von der Natur nicht vorgesehen (Autobiography, 1974)
 Aber die Hoffnung. Autobiographisches aus und über Deutschland (Autobiography, 1982)
 Unaufhaltsam (Poem, 1962)
 Rufe nicht
 Der Baum blüht trotzdem (Poems, 1999), 
 Vielleicht eine Lilie. Water colours by Andreas Felger. Hünfelden: Präsenz Kunst & Buch, (1999)
 Ausgewählte Gedichte (Selected poems), Frankfurt am Main: Fischer Taschenbuch Verlag, (2000)
 Wer es könnte. Water colours by Andreas Felger. Hünfelden: Präsenz Kunst & Buch, (2000)
 Auf Wolkenbürgschaft. Water colours by Andreas Felger. Hünfelden: Präsenz Kunst & Buch, (2005)

Her work has been translated into more than 21 languages.

Awards and prizes
For her work Hilde Domin has been awarded a wide range of prizes including:
 Bundesverdienstkreuz Erster Klasse and the Großes Bundesverdienstkreuz
 1974 Roswitha Prize
 1983 Nelly Sachs Prize
 1992 Friedrich-Hölderlin-Preis of the city of Bad Homburg
 1995 Literaturpreis der Konrad-Adenauer-Stiftung
 1999 Jakob-Wassermann-Literaturpreis
 1999 State Prize of the Federal state of North Rhine-Westphalia
 2004 Honorary citizenship (Ehrenbürgerin) City of Heidelberg
 2005 Order of Merit of Duarte, Sánchez and Mella, which is the highest order of the Dominican Republic.

Readings and lectures
 Guest of Honour at the Villa Massimo, Rome (1985)
 Frankfurter Poetik-Vorlesungen (1987/88)
 May 2005: Reading of selected poems in both German and English, organized by Oxford University German Society.

See also

Erwin Walter Palm

Notes

References
 References in Hoy newspaper article (2006, in Spanish)
 Article in Frankfurter Allgemeine Zeitung (in German)
 Article in Die Welt (in German)
 Article in Spiegel Online (in German)
 References in the National German Library

External links
 English translations of poems by Hilde Domin
 PEN Centre of German speaking authors in exile
 CV hosted by the University of Heidelberg (in German)
 Literature map: What else do readers of Hilde Domin read?
 Analysis of "Nur eine Rose als Stütze" (German)
Special collections and archives
 Collection reference at SIBMAS
 German Literature Archive in Marbach
 Correspondence with Gisela Blauner Graf (1967-1987)

1909 births
2006 deaths
Writers from Cologne
People from the Rhine Province
Jewish emigrants from Nazi Germany to the United Kingdom
German memoirists
University of Bonn alumni
Commanders Crosses of the Order of Merit of the Federal Republic of Germany
Order of Merit of Duarte, Sánchez and Mella
German women novelists
Women memoirists
German women poets
20th-century German poets
20th-century German novelists
20th-century German women writers
German emigrants to the Dominican Republic
20th-century memoirists